Rise Again is the debut album by American heavy metal band Alabama Thunderpussy, released in 1998.

Track listing
 "Falling Behind" - 4:42
 "Victory Through Defeat" - 4:26
 "Folk Lore" - 5:06
 "Lord's Prayer" - 3:05
 "Get Mad/Get Even" - 6:41
 "When Mercury Drops" - 4:30
 "Ivy" - 4:08
 "Speaking in Tongues" - 7:25
 "Jackass" - 3:05
 "Alto Vista" - 5:56
 "Podium" - 3:21
 "Fever 103" - 5:37
 "Dixie" - 0:34

Personnel
 Johnny Throckmorton - vocals
 Erik Larson - guitar
 Asechiah "Cleetus LeRoque" Bogden - guitar
 Bill Storms - bass
 Bryan Cox - drums

Production
Arranged by Alabama Thunderpussy
Produced by Alabama Thunderpussy and Mark Miley
Engineered and mixed by Mark Miley
Mastered by Bill McElroy

References

1998 debut albums
Alabama Thunderpussy albums
Relapse Records albums